Bethany Sarah Whitmore (born 7 December 1999) is an Australian actress, who started her professional acting career starring as Jaden Kagan in the US TV mini-series The Starter Wife.  Bethany is also known for her lead voice role of 8-year-old Mary Daisy Dinkle in Adam Elliot's Mary and Max (2009), Jane Moochmore in PJ Hogan's Mental (2012), Greta Driscoll in Girl Asleep (2015), Melissa in The Family Law (2016–19) and Blanche Gifford in the TV series remake of Picnic at Hanging Rock (2017).  Bethany was also a finalist for the 10th anniversary Heath Ledger Scholarship in 2018.

Personal life 
Whitmore was born in Melbourne, Australia. Since childhood, she has pursued an acting career. At age 6, she starred in The Starter Wife. She studied drama at RADA, NIDA, St Martins Youth Theatre, & 16th Street. Her theatre appearances include Cat on a Hot Tin Roof for the Melbourne Theatre Company.

Whitmore currently resides in Melbourne.

Filmography

Films
Mary and Max (2009) as the voice of 8-year-old Mary Daisy Dinkle
Summer Coda (2010) as Katie
Mental (2012) as Jane Moochmore
Girl Asleep (2015) as Greta Driscoll

Television
Rove Live (2006) as Panellist 'Understanding 5's' Commercial Spoof (1 episode)
The Starter Wife (2007) as Jaden Kagan (6 episodes) "Hour 1", "Hour 2", "Hour 3", "Hour 4", "Hour 5" and "Hour 6"
Rush (2008) as Sadie 1 episode: "Pilot"
Whatever Happened to That Guy? (2009) as Bethany (1 episode)
Thank God You're Here (2009) as Additional Cast (1 episode)
Killing Time (2011) as Olivia Fraser (7 episodes)
Winners & Losers (2011) as Maddie Sommers (2 episodes)
The Family Law (2016–19) as Melissa Hills in S1, S2 & S3 (18 episodes)
Picnic at Hanging Rock (2017) as Blanche Gifford (6 episodes)

Awards

Won MEAA Equity Best Comedy Ensemble 2020 – S3 The Family Law
Finalist – Heath Ledger Scholarship 2018 HLS10 Australians in Film
Nominated Best Young Actor – St Kilda Film Festival 2018 – MWAH Short Film
Won MEAA Equity Best Comedy Ensemble 2018 – S2 The Family Law
Nominated Best Actress: Film Critics Circle of Australia Award 2017 for Girl Asleep
Nominated Best Actress: Australian Film Critics Association Award 2017 for Girl Asleep
Won MEAA Equity Best Comedy Ensemble 2017 – S1 The Family Law
Won 16th Street Foundation Young Actors Award 2017

References

External links

Australian child actresses
1999 births
Living people
Australian television actresses